Enrique 'Kike' Mateo Montoya (born 30 December 1979) is a Spanish retired footballer who played as an attacking midfielder and manager.

Football career 
Born in Murcia, Mateo spent until the age of 25 in the third and fourth divisions, when he signed with SD Eibar in the summer of 2004. During the second level campaign he did not miss one single game, as the Basque team nearly achieved an historical La Liga promotion, eventually finishing fourth; subsequently he played another two seasons in division two, with Hércules CF, also appearing and scoring regularly.

In 2007–08, Mateo proved instrumental for Sporting de Gijón, whom he joined in July 2007 as a free agent, netting a squad-best 12 goals as the Asturias club returned to the top flight after a ten-year absence. He made his competition debut on 31 August 2008 in a 1–2 home loss against Getafe CF, and scored his first goal two rounds later, in a 1–7 demolition defeat at Real Madrid– as Sporting avoided relegation in the last matchday, his other goal of the season came against FC Barcelona (1–3 loss at the Camp Nou on 8 February 2009)– and he appeared in a total of 24 matches, 14 from the bench.

On 16 July 2010, aged nearly 31, Mateo signed with Elche CF in the second tier, for three years. He left at the end of his second season, and resumed his career in the lower leagues.

References

External links 

1979 births
Living people
Spanish footballers
Footballers from Murcia
Association football midfielders
La Liga players
Segunda División players
Segunda División B players
Tercera División players
Pinatar CF players
Orihuela CF players
Ciudad de Murcia footballers
RCD Mallorca B players
RCD Mallorca players
Lorca Deportiva CF footballers
SD Eibar footballers
Hércules CF players
Sporting de Gijón players
Elche CF players
UCAM Murcia CF players
Spanish football managers